Carbyne (R-C⫶) is a class of chemical compounds with three dangling bonds on a carbon atom.

Carbyne may also refer to:
 The methylidyne radical (⫶CH), the parent member and namesake of the carbyne family
 Linear acetylenic carbon (C≡C−)n, a form of carbon with chains of alternating single and triple bounds
 A polyyne, a molecule with such a chain in its molecular structure

See also

 Carlyne